Andrew Morton may refer to:

Andrew Morton (computer programmer) (born 1959), Linux kernel programmer/coordinator
Andrew Morton (painter) (1802–1845), English portrait artist
Andrew Morton (writer) (born 1953), biographer of Diana, Princess of Wales, Angelina Jolie, Madonna, amongst others
Andy Morton, Australian rugby league footballer for North Sydney Bears
 Andrew Morton (1812–1881), pioneering doctor and coroner of Weetangera, Australian Capital Territory

See also
Andrew Marton (1904–1992), Hungarian-American film director, producer and editor